Agylla strigula is a moth of the family Erebidae. It was described by George Hampson in 1900. It is found in Bolivia.

References

Moths described in 1900
strigula
Moths of South America